Lnx may refer to:
 , the natural logarithm function
 LNX, the IATA code for Smolensk North Airport in Russia
 Lil Nas X, American rapper and singer